Suratissa was an early monarch of Sri Lanka of the Kingdom of Anuradhapura, based at the ancient capital of Anuradhapura from 247 BC to 237 BC. He was the younger son of Pandukabhaya and the brother of Mutasiva. Suratissa was defeated and killed in battle by two South Indian Tamil invaders Sena and Guttika and usurped the Sinhalese throne and became joint rules of Anuradhapura, which was the first historically reported account of Tamil rule in Sri Lanka. Sinhala rule was re-established in 215 BC.

See also
 List of Sri Lankan monarchs

External links 
 Kings & Rulers of Sri Lanka
 Codrington's Short History of Ceylon

Monarchs of Anuradhapura
S
 Sinhalese Buddhist monarchs
3rd-century BC Sinhalese monarchs
S